Baron Batch (born December 21, 1987), self-styled "The Artist", a Pittsburgh-based entrepreneur and former American football running back who retired from the National Football League (NFL) in 2013. He played college football at Texas Tech University.  Batch chose to play college football at Texas Tech University over offers from Northwestern University, Duke University, and New Mexico State University. Batch is from Midland, Texas.  He is the owner and creator of Angry Man Salsa and creative director of Studio AM. He is the brother of Brian Batch of the band Alpha Rev.

Professional career
Batch was drafted in the seventh round, 232nd overall, of the 2011 NFL draft by the Pittsburgh Steelers. He was figured to be in competition to replace Mewelde Moore as the third-down back, given his receiving and blocking experience in Mike Leach's Air Raid offense at Texas Tech. However, Batch tore his ACL during a training camp practice on August 11, 2011 and was out for the season. He was officially placed on injured reserve on August 28.

On Thursday October 11, 2012 Baron ran for 22 yards on 10 attempts against the Tennessee Titans. This was his first game with more than 5 rushing attempts in the NFL. He was released by the Pittsburgh Steelers on November 20, 2012 in order to make a necessary roster move, but picked back up to be on the practice squad the next day, November 21, 2012. A week later, he was re-signed to the 53-man roster.

On August 25, 2013, he was cut by the Steelers and retired from professional football.

College career
Batch finished his collegiate career at Tech as the school's eighth-ranked all-time leader in rushing with 2,501 yards. During his senior season at Texas Tech, Batch led the team in rushing with 816 yards on 177 carries, an average of 4.20 yards per carry. He also caught 32 passes for 226 yards and three receiving touchdowns. In 2009, as a junior, he rushed 146 times for 784 yards and 12 touchdowns, along with 51 receptions for 310 yards and 1 touchdown. In the Alamo Bowl against Michigan State following his junior year he had 99 yards on 22 rushes for 2 touchdowns and 6 receptions for 85 yards. As a sophomore Batch rushed 113 times for 758 yards and 7 touchdowns. He also caught 45 passes for 449 yards and a touchdown.

The Artist
Batch is an artist based out of Pittsburgh, PA where he is creative director of the event space, art gallery and creative agency, Studio AM, where he and other creatives collaborate. Batch self-describes his art as POP-X genre of art, a mix of Pop Art and Expressionism reminiscent of street-art styles developed in the 70's and 80's. He is formerly the owner and creator of Angry Man Salsa, a high-end dipping salsa available online in limited editions.  Batch admitted to painting graffiti along the bike trail from Hot Metal Bridge to Sandcastle.

An arrest warrant was issued by the Pittsburgh Police for 30 counts of criminal mischief involving graffiti. In May 2017, he was given an 18-month suspended sentence and community service.

Batch was described as a "Creative Force" in Whirl magazine, and  has labeled himself "The Artist". His artwork is a major staple of the Pittsburgh Yoga scene.

In April 2013, Baron Batch was chosen as the featured artist at the 35th annual Lubbock Arts Festival.  His work was displayed over three days at the Lubbock Memorial Civic Center from April 12–14.

References

External links
Biography at Texas Tech Athletics

1987 births
Living people
People from Odessa, Texas
American artists
Texas Tech Red Raiders football players
Pittsburgh Steelers players
Players of American football from Texas
Artists from Texas
American football running backs